Protein POF1B is a protein that in humans is encoded by the POF1B gene.

References

Further reading